Niall Duthie is a novelist.

He was born on 15 May 1947 in Aberdeen, Scotland. He was brought up there, and in Ghana, England and Malaysia. He is the author of three acclaimed novels: The Duchess's Dragonfly (1993, Phoenix House, Orion). Natterjack, (1996, Faber & Faber) and Lobster Moth (1999, Fourth Estate). He is currently working on three novels about women.

References

Scottish novelists
1947 births
Living people